Marcel Simon may refer to:

 Marcel Simon (historian) (1907–1986), French religious historian
 Marcel Simon (footballer) (born 1994), German footballer

See also
 Marcel Simoneau (born 1978), Canadian film actor, writer, and director